Élisabeth Claude Jacquet de La Guerre (née Jacquet, 17 March 1665 – 27 June 1729) was a French musician, harpsichordist and composer.

Life and works
Élisabeth-Claude Jacquet de La Guerre (née Jacquet) was born on March 17, 1665, into a family of musicians and master instrument-makers in the parish of Saint-Louis-en-l'Île, Paris. She came from a rich family of masons, musicians, composers, and instrument makers. Her grandfather, Jehan Jacquet, and her father, Claude Jacquet, were harpsichord makers. Rather than just teaching his sons, Claude Jacquet taught both his sons and daughters how to survive and thrive in the world. This upbringing, support from her father, and her family's rich history of musicianship was a major stepping stone for her musical career. She received her initial musical education from her father. At the age of five, Louis XIV took notice of her when she performed, evidently as a child prodigy, at his palace of Versailles. This eventually led to her becoming a musician in the court of Louis XIV, the Sun King. She wrote most of her works for her king, which was common. As a teenager she was accepted into the French court where her education was supervised by the king's mistress, Françoise-Athénaïs, marquise de Montespan. She stayed with the royal court until it moved to Versailles. In 1684 she married the organist Marin de La Guerre, son of the late organist at the Sainte-Chapelle, Michel de La Guerre. After her marriage she taught, composed, and gave concerts at home and throughout Paris, to great acclaim.

Jacquet de La Guerre was one of the few well-known female composers of her time, and unlike many of her contemporaries, she composed in a wide variety of forms. Her talent and achievements were acknowledged by Titon du Tillet, who accorded her a place on his Mount Parnassus when she was only 26 years old, next to Lalande and Marais and directly below Lully. A quote from Titon du Tillet describes her
marvellous facility for playing preludes and fantasies off the cuff. Sometimes she improvises one or another for a whole half hour with tunes and harmonies of great variety and in quite the best possible taste, quite charming her listeners.(Le Parnasse françois, 1732)

Her first published work was her Premier livre de pièces de clavessin, printed in 1687, which includes unmeasured preludes. It was one of the few collections of harpsichord pieces printed in France in the 17th century, along with those of Chambonnières, Lebègue and d'Anglebert. During the 1690s she composed a ballet, Les Jeux à l'honneur de la victoire (c. 1691), which has subsequently been lost. On 15 March 1694, the production of her opera Céphale et Procris at the Académie Royale de Musique was the first of an opera written by a woman in France. The five-act tragédie lyrique was set to a libretto by Duché de Vancy. Like her contemporaries, she also experimented with Italian genres: principally the sonata and the cantata. In 1695 she composed a set of trio sonatas which, with those of Marc-Antoine Charpentier, François Couperin, Jean-Féry Rebel and Sébastien de Brossard, are among the earliest French examples of the sonata.

Her only published opera only had 5 or 6 performances. An explanation of this failure was that the opera depended on the text rather than the music. Cephale et Procris would soon be known as tragedie en musique, a tragedy put into music, and French literary theatre recited musically. Her compositions were not received well by the French musical culture, which was cautious about contemporary opera. It might have been accepted more readily in Italy with all its musical innovations, but in France, tradition was considered necessary in its music. The reception of Cephale et Procris tells us more about the world of opera in France in the 1690s and French music rather than her ability as a composer. This put a stop to her career as an operatic composer.

During the next few years many of her near relations died, including her only son who was ten years old, her mother, father, husband, and brother Nicolas. She continued to perform, however, and in 1707 her collection Pièces de Clavecin qui peuvent se jouer sur le Violon, a new set of harpsichord pieces, was published, followed by six Sonates pour le violon et pour le clavecin. These works are an early example of the new genre of accompanied harpsichord works, where the instrument is used in an obbligato role with the violin; Rameau's Pièces de clavecin en concerts are somewhat of the same type. The dedication of the 1707 work speaks of the continuing admiration and patronage of Louis XIV:
Such happiness for me, Sire, if my latest work may receive as glorious a reception from Your Majesty as I have enjoyed almost from the cradle, for, Sire, if I may remind you, you never spurned my youthful offerings. You took pleasure in seeing the birth of the talent that I have devoted to you; and you honoured me even then with your commendations, of the value of which I had no understanding at the time. My slender talents have since grown. I have striven even harder, Sire, to deserve your approbation, which has always meant everything to me ...

She returned to vocal composition with the publication of two books of Cantates françoises sur des sujets tirez de l'Ecriture in 1708 and 1711. Her last published work was a collection of secular Cantates françoises (c. 1715). In the inventory of her possessions after her death, there were three harpsichords: a small instrument with white and black keys, one with black keys, and a large double manual Flemish harpsichord.

Jacquet de La Guerre died in Paris in 1729, aged 64.

Reception
Despite the poor reception of her opera, she continued to publish her work and take opportunities. Her sonatas, from later in her life, are considered triumphs of the genre. This is due to her development of the role for violin and the way she blended French traditions with Italian innovations. After her death, her genius in compositions, her creativity in vocal and instrumental music, and her variety of genres have been acknowledged. Her life and career success show that she was given a rare opportunity to succeed as a female composer, and show that she took full advantage of it.

During the 1990s there was a renewed interest in her compositions and a number have been recorded.

List of works
Jacquet de La Guerre's early trio sonatas and violin/viola da gamba sonatas survive only in manuscript sources in Paris. The rest of her output is thought to have been published in her lifetime, although Titon du Tillet mentioned a lost Te Deum setting in his tribute to Jacquet de La Guerre.

Stage
Les jeux à l'honneur de la victoire (ballet, c. 1691), lost
Céphale et Procris (tragédie lyrique, 1694)

Vocal music
 Cantates françoises sur des sujets tirez de l'Ecriture, livre I (Paris, 1708)
 Esther
 Le passage de la Mer rouge
 Jacob et Rachel
 Jonas
 Suzanne et les vieillards
 Judith
 Cantates françoises, livre II (Paris, 1711)
 Adam
 Le temple rebasti
 Le deluge
 Joseph
 Jepthe
 Sampson
 La musette, ou Les bergers de Suresne (Paris, 1713)
 Cantates françoises (Paris, c.1715 [3 cantatas; 1 comic duet])
 Semelé
 L'Ile de Delos
 Le Sommeil d'Ulisse
 Le Raccommodement Comique de Pierrot et de Nicole
 Te Deum (1721, lost)
 Various songs published in Recueil d'airs sérieux et à boire (1710–24)

Instrumental
 Les pièces de clavessin (Paris, 1687)
 Suite in D minor: Prelude / Allemande / Courante / 2d Courante / Sarabande / Gigue / Cannaris / Chaconne l'Inconstante / Menuet
 Suite in G minor: Prelude / Allemande / Courante / 2d Courante / Sarabande / Gigue / 2d Gigue / Menuet
 Suite in A minor: Prelude / Allemande / Courante / 2d Courante / Sarabande / Gigue / Chaconne / Gavott / Menuet
 Suite in F major: Tocade / Allemande / Courante / 2d Courante / Sarabande / Gigue / Cannaris / Menuet
 Pièces de clavecin qui peuvent se jouer sur le violon (Paris, 1707)
 Suite in D minor: La Flamande / Double / Courante / Double / Sarabande / Gigue / Double / 2d Gigue / Rigadoun / 2d Rigadoun / Chaconne
 Suite in G major: Allemande / Courante / Sarabande / Gigue / Menuet / Rondeau
 Sonatas [2], violin, viola da gamba, and basso continuo (c.1695)
 Sonatas [6], violin and clavecin (Paris [chez l'auteur, Foucault, Ribou, Ballard], 1707)
 Sonata [no. 1] in D minor: Grave / Presto / Adagio / Presto-Adagio / Presto / Aria / Presto
 Sonata [no. 2] in D major: Grave / Allegro / Aria (Affettusos) / Sarabande / Gavotte (Allegro) / Presto
 Sonata [no. 3] in F major: Grave / Presto-Adagio / Presto / Aria / Adagio
 Sonata [no. 4] in G major: [Grave]-Presto-Adagio / Presto-Adagio / Presto-Adagio / Aria
 Sonata [no. 5] in A minor: Grave / Presto / Adagio-Courante-Reprise / Aria
 Sonata [no. 6] in A major: Allemande / Presto / Adagio / Aria / Adagio / Presto-Adagio / Aria

See also
List of French harpsichordists

References

Further reading
 Cessac, Catherine. Élisabeth Jacquet de La Guerre: Une femme compositeur sous le règne de Louis XIV. Paris: Actes Sud, 1995.

External links

Cantates francoises et Duet Comique
La musette, ou Les bergers de Suresne

1665 births
1729 deaths
17th-century women composers
18th-century classical composers
18th-century French composers
18th-century women composers
18th-century keyboardists
French Baroque composers
French women classical composers
French harpsichordists
Musicians from Paris
Child classical musicians